West Cape May is a Walsh Act borough in Cape May County, in the U.S. state of New Jersey. It is part of the Ocean City metropolitan statistical area. As of the 2020 United States census, the borough's population was 1,010, a decrease of 14 (−1.4%) from the 2010 census count of 1,024, which in turn reflected a decline of 71 (−6.5%) from the 1,095 counted in the 2000 census.

West Cape May was incorporated as a borough by an act of the New Jersey Legislature on April 17, 1884, from portions of Lower Township, based on the results of a referendum held two days earlier. The borough was reincorporated on April 11, 1890, and again on May 4, 1897. The borough's name derives from Cape May, which was named for 1620 Dutch captain named Cornelius Jacobsen May who explored and charted the area between 1611 and 1614, and established a claim for the province of New Netherland.

West Cape May had been a dry town until May 2012, when a new store opened after the Board of Commissioners approved the sale of a liquor license for more than $600,000. In 2008, voters approved a referendum that allowed the issuance of a single license for retail liquor sales and another for sale of alcoholic beverages at a restaurant. The borough had been dry for 128 years, where alcohol cannot be sold, affirmed by the results of a referendum held in 1940, joining Cape May Point, Ocean City and Wildwood Crest among municipalities in Cape May restricting the sale of alcohol.

History

The borough's history goes back to the time of the Lenape Native Americans. Several buildings in the borough date to the Colonial period. The area has a rich agricultural history which continues to be celebrated each year with a summer farmers' market, and strawberry, tomato and lima bean festivals. It has been known as the "Lima Bean Capital of the World." The Lima Bean Festival is an annual event held in West Cape May, New Jersey, the "Lima Bean Capital of the World", and is the world's only such celebration. It is held annually on the Saturday of Columbus Day weekend in Wilbraham Park.

West Cape May, once known as Eldredge, is one of the four jurisdictions that comprise Cape Island in Cape May County. West Cape May was incorporated as a borough by an act of the New Jersey Legislature on April 17, 1884, from portions of Lower Township, based on the results of a referendum held two days earlier. The borough was reincorporated on April 11, 1890, and again on May 4, 1897.

The Borough has reported ties to the Underground Railroad.

From 1881 to 1931, the Hastings Goldbeating Company was located in the Borough employing women to pound one-inch strips of gold into gossamer-thin sheets used for decorative arts. Women continued to do the "booking" of gold leaf sheets until 1961. A plaque indicating the location of the factory can be found on Goldbeaten Alley. It was this business, along with real estate speculation and subdivision of the land, that led to the Borough's incorporation in 1884.

Historic sites
The historic core of the Borough was placed on the National Register of Historic Places along with sections of the City of Cape May in 1976.

Whilldin-Miller House was added to the National Register of Historic Places on February 12, 2003. The original timber frame two-story house remaining in the rear was built by Joseph Whilldin about 1715, while the front portion of the house was built in 1860, making it one of the oldest remaining houses on Cape Island.

Geography
According to the United States Census Bureau, the borough had a total area of 1.19 square miles (3.07 km2), including 1.17 square miles (3.04 km2) of land and 0.01 square miles (0.03 km2) of water (1.09%).

The borough borders the Cape May County municipalities of Cape May City and Lower Township.

Demographics

2010 census

The Census Bureau's 2006–2010 American Community Survey showed that (in 2010 inflation-adjusted dollars) median household income was $48,281 (with a margin of error of +/− $6,924) and the median family income was $51,394 (+/− $3,176). Males had a median income of $42,361 (+/− $10,529) versus $43,860 (+/− $3,583) for females. The per capita income for the borough was $34,328 (+/− $4,010). About 8.4% of families and 6.7% of the population were below the poverty line, including 8.0% of those under age 18 and 4.8% of those age 65 or over.

2000 census
As of the 2000 United States census there were 1,095 people, 507 households, and 302 families residing in the borough. The racial makeup of the borough was 84.11% White, 14.52% African American, 0.37% Native American, 0.55% from other races, and 0.46% from two or more races. Hispanic or Latino of any race were 1.83% of the population.

There were 507 households, out of which 21.1% had children under the age of 18 living with them, 44.2% were married couples living together, 11.2% had a female householder with no husband present, and 40.4% were non-families. 35.1% of all households were made up of individuals, and 17.4% had someone living alone who was 65 years of age or older. The average household size was 2.16 and the average family size was 2.80.

In the borough the population was spread out, with 19.6% under the age of 18, 3.6% from 18 to 24, 23.7% from 25 to 44, 28.7% from 45 to 64, and 24.4% who were 65 years of age or older. The median age was 46 years. For every 100 females, there were 92.8 males. For every 100 females age 18 and over, there were 88.4 males.

The median income for a household in the borough was $37,500, and the median income for a family was $47,031. Males had a median income of $36,375 versus $29,583 for females. The per capita income for the borough was $25,663. About 4.7% of families and 7.4% of the population were below the poverty line, including 6.3% of those under age 18 and 8.9% of those age 65 or over.

African-Americans
African-Americans have been in West Cape May since the early 1800s. There is a West Cape May African-American Historical Society. Julie Lasky of The New York Times wrote that "until recently" the African-American community was "vibrant" but that by 2020 the percentage declined to 5%.

Government

Local government
The Borough of West Cape May has operated under the Walsh Act form of government since 1948. The borough is one of 30 municipalities (of the 564) statewide to use the commission form of government, down from a peak of 60 early in the 20th century and with most remaining municipalities using the form being shore communities. The Board of Commissioners is comprised of three members, who are elected at-large in non-partisan elections held as part of the November general election and serve four-year, concurrent terms of office. Once the Commissioners take office, they divide up responsibility for the municipal departments, with each Commissioner serving as a Department Director and holds all the executive, administrative, judicial and legislative powers, with no single chief executive. An ordinance adopted by the Board of Commissioners in December 2012 shifted the borough's municipal elections from May to November.

, the borough's commissioners are Mayor Carol E. Sabo (Commissioner of Revenue and Finance), Deputy Mayor Peter C. Burke (Commissioner of Public Works, Parks and Public Property) and Daniel M. Kurkowski (Commissioner of Public Affairs and Public Safety), who are all serving concurrent terms of office that end December 31, 2025.

Carol Sabo was appointed in early 2013 to fill the vacant seat of Ramsay Geyer, who had resigned to move out of the borough. Kaithern, Burke and Sabo were all re-elected in November 2013.

Federal, state and county representation
West Cape May is located in the 2nd Congressional District and is part of New Jersey's 1st state legislative district.

Politics
As of March 2011, there were a total of 776 registered voters in West Cape May, of which 249 (32.1%) were registered as Democrats, 284 (36.6%) were registered as Republicans and 241 (31.1%) were registered as Unaffiliated. There were 2 voters registered as either Libertarians or Greens.

In the 2012 presidential election, Democrat Barack Obama received 61.0% of the vote (385 cast), ahead of Republican Mitt Romney with 37.2% (235 votes), and other candidates with 1.7% (11 votes), among the 640 ballots cast by the borough's 830 registered voters (9 ballots were spoiled), for a turnout of 77.1%. In the 2008 presidential election, Democrat Barack Obama received 62.9% of the vote (387 cast), ahead of Republican John McCain, who received 35.0% (215 votes), with 615 ballots cast among the borough's 752 registered voters, for a turnout of 81.8%. In the 2004 presidential election, Democrat John Kerry received 60.5% of the vote (377 ballots cast), outpolling Republican George W. Bush, who received around 38.5% (240 votes), with 623 ballots cast among the borough's 818 registered voters, for a turnout percentage of 76.2.

In the 2013 gubernatorial election, Republican Chris Christie received 59.8% of the vote (329 cast), ahead of Democrat Barbara Buono with 37.6% (207 votes), and other candidates with 2.5% (14 votes), among the 582 ballots cast by the borough's 816 registered voters (32 ballots were spoiled), for a turnout of 71.3%. In the 2009 gubernatorial election, Democrat Jon Corzine received 52.2% of the vote (245 ballots cast), ahead of both Republican Chris Christie with 39.0% (183 votes) and Independent Chris Daggett with 6.0% (28 votes), with 469 ballots cast among the borough's 778 registered voters, yielding a 60.3% turnout.

Education

The West Cape May School District serves students in pre-kindergarten through sixth grade at West Cape May Elementary School. As of the 2018–19 school year, the district, comprised of one school, had an enrollment of 99 students and 9.7 classroom teachers (on an FTE basis), for a student–teacher ratio of 10.2:1. In the 2016–17 school year, the district had 98 students, making it the eighth-smallest district in the state.

For seventh through twelfth grades, public school students attend the schools of the Lower Cape May Regional School District, which serves students from Cape May, Lower Township and West Cape May, along with students from Cape May Point who attend as part of a sending/receiving relationship. As of the 2018–19 school year, the high school district, comprised of two schools, had an enrollment of 1,330 students and 118.7 classroom teachers (on an FTE basis), for a student–teacher ratio of 11.2:1. Schools in the district (with 2018–19 enrollment data from the National Center for Education Statistics) are 
Richard M. Teitelman Middle School with 472 students in grades 7–8 and 
Lower Cape May Regional High School with 828 students in grades 9–12. The district's board of education has nine members, who are elected directly by voters to serve three-year terms of office on a staggered basis, with three seats up for election each year. Seats on the board are allocated based on population, with West Cape May assigned one seat.

In 2013, the Lower Cape May Regional School District received a feasibility study that looked at ways to reconfigure the district, which had been established in 1956. The study considered Cape May City withdrawing from the regional district or the dissolution of the district, converting Lower Township's existing Pre-K–6 district to serve Pre-K–12, as the regional district's school facilities are located in the township. Cape May City and West Cape May could see annual savings approaching a combined $6 million from the dissolution.

Students are also eligible to attend Cape May County Technical High School in Cape May Court House, which serves students from the entire county in its comprehensive and vocational programs, which are offered without charge to students who are county residents. Special needs students may be referred to Cape May County Special Services School District in the Cape May Court House area.

History
Previously a West Cape May High School existed. In an era of de jure educational segregation in the United States normally only white students were permitted to attend though the state made exceptions. Ordinarily black students attended a different industrial high school. The district maintained separate white and black elementary schools.

Transportation

Roads and highways

No Interstate, U.S., state or major county highways serve West Cape May. The most significant roads in the borough are minor county routes, such as County Route 607.

Public transportation
NJ Transit offers bus service between Cape May and Atlantic City on the 552 route.

Parks and recreation

Wilbraham Park is in West Cape May. Every October the lima bean festival is held in that park. There is also a strawberry festival in West Cape May, sponsored by the West Cape May Business Association.

Wineries
 Willow Creek Winery

References

External links

 West Cape May Borough website
 West Cape May Commissioners for All the People website
 West Cape May Business Association website
 The Cape May Gazette – Weekly newspaper covering West Cape May

 
1884 establishments in New Jersey
Boroughs in Cape May County, New Jersey
Populated places established in 1884
Populated places on the Underground Railroad
Walsh Act